Micracis festiva is a species of typical bark beetle in the family Curculionidae. There are over 60 described of it found in Mexico.

References 

Scolytinae
Beetles described in 1969